Spring Song or Spring Songs may refer to:

Film
 Spring Song (1944 film), a Czech film
 Spring Song (1946 film), a British drama film
 Spring Song (1954 film), a German-Italian drama film
 Fate/stay night: Heaven's Feel III. spring song, a 2020 Japanese anime film

Music
 "Spring Song," common name for the Song Without Words, Opus 62 No.1 in A major, or Frühlingslied by Felix Mendelssohn
 Spring Song (Sibelius), an 1894 orchestral piece by Jean Sibelius
 Spring Songs, 1981 cycle of songs by William Doppmann
 Spring Songs (EP), by Title Fight
 "Spring Song", a song by Gryphon from the album Treason